XTX Markets is an algorithmic trading company. It was founded on 30 January 2015 by Alex Gerko who is currently co-CEO alongside Zar Amrolia.

History
The company was founded by Gerko in 2015, based in London. It was a spin-off GSA Capital.

In 2016, XTX Markets was the ninth-largest liquidity provider in the foreign exchange market by volume; with a 3.87% market share. It was the first time a company that is not a bank placed in the top ten of the Euromoney survey. It is part of a trend of non-bank traders taking market share from banks. 

In 2017, the company became a non-clearing member of the London Stock Exchange.

In 2018, it was the third-largest liquidity provider in the global foreign exchange market by volume; with a 7.36% market share. The company had 11.5% market share of European equity markets. Other activities included taking a stake in Aquis Exchange, setting up a foreign exchange 'pricing engine' in Singapore in conjunction with the Monetary Authority of Singapore and announcing it would be opening an 'EU hub' in Paris.

In 2019, XTX became the largest FX spot liquidity provider globally.

In March 2020, XTX donated over £20m to charities fighting the effects of COVID-19 including NHS Charities Together, City Harvest and the AP-HP hospital.

XTX released a statement in March 2022 regarding its support for the Ukrainian people and all those affected by the war in Ukraine. This included details around £23.4mn of commitments to charities providing humanitarian relief to Ukraine.

In April 2022, XTX released a statement detailing its climate pledges.

In June 2022, XTX announced the launch of its £15mn Academic Sanctuaries Fund with the goal of helping deliver more and better academic sanctuary places for students and researchers who have been forced to flee due to the war in Ukraine, including for voicing their opposition to it, but have no alternatives.

Products
XTX is a quantitative driven electronic liquidity provider which partners with counterparties, exchanges and e-trading venues globally to provide liquidity in the equity, foreign exchange, fixed income and commodity markets.

In 2018, XTX decided to opt into the systematic internaliser regime for European equities.
In November 2019 XTX became the largest systematic internaliser by volume for European equities.
XTX has since been the largest Systematic Internaliser for 3 years running.

In 2019, the company grew its market share in the U.S. and expanded into providing liquidity in U.S. Treasuries.

In March 2021, the company began offering a single dealer platform for U.S. equities.

XTX Markets also launched a VC arm, XTX Ventures , an early-stage VC fund investing solely in companies with machine learning as a core technology.

References

Currency traders
2015 establishments in the United Kingdom
Financial services companies established in 2015
Financial services companies based in London
Corporate spin-offs